New Zealand Ecological Restoration Network (NZERN) is an environmental organisation dedicated to protecting and restoring the biodiversity of New Zealand.

References

Environmental organisations based in New Zealand